The Word is a 1953 American short documentary film produced by John Adams. The film is about Frank Laubach and his work on literacy. The Word was nominated for an Academy Award for Best Documentary Short.

References

External links

1953 films
1950s short documentary films
1953 documentary films
American short documentary films
20th Century Fox short films
1950s English-language films
1950s American films